Moonstrike is a British television series produced by the BBC in 1963.

The series was an anthology programme: a collection of self-contained stories about acts of resistance in occupied Europe during the Second World War. Producer Gerard Glaister drew upon his own wartime experiences, having served as a pilot in the RAF.

Most of the music for the series was provided by composer Dudley Simpson, and was some of his first work in the field of composing 'incidental music'.

Only three episodes of the series of 27 still exist.

Episodes
 Home by Four, TX: 21 February 1963
 A Clear Field, TX: 28 February 1963
 Message Received, TX: 7 March 1963
 Five Hours to Kill, TX: 14 March 1963
 Return to Danger, TX: 21 March 1963
 A Safe House, TX: 28 March 1963
 Danger by Appointment, TX: 4 April 1963
 Unwelcome Guest, TX: 11 April 1963
 Round Trip, TX: 18 April 1963
 No Joy, TX: 25 April 1963
 A Sunday Morning, 2 May 1963
 Death Sentence, 9 May 1963
 The Expert, TX: 16 May 1963
 Four To Go, TX 23 May 1963
 Last Act, TX: 30 May 1963
 A Girl Friend, TX: 6 June 1963. This episode survives.
 The Biggest Bandit, TX: 13 June 1963. This episode survives.
 The Escape, TX: 20 June 1963
 Rush Job, TX: 27 June 1963
 He Who Tells, TX: 4 July 1963
 A Matter of Trust, TX: 11 July 1963
 The Factory, TX: 18 Jul 1963. This episode survives.
 The Canary, TX: 25 July 1963
 Try Out, TX: 1 August 1963
 The Bells Are Silent, TX: 8 August 1963
 No Heroics, TX: 15 August 1963
 The Last Mission, TX: 27 August 1963

References

External links

BBC television dramas
World War II television drama series
1960s British anthology television series
1960s British drama television series
1963 British television series debuts
1963 British television series endings
Black-and-white British television shows
English-language television shows